Le Grand Bleu is a superyacht. She was built at the Bremer Vulkan yard in Bremen, Germany, and was launched in 2000. She was designed by Stefano Pastrovich and constructed by Kusch Yachts.

History

Le Grand Bleu was built at the Bremer Vulkan yard in Bremen, Germany, and was launched in 2000. She was designed by Stefano Pastrovich and constructed by Kusch Yachts. 

She was commissioned by John McCaw, Jr., an American businessman, who sold her to Russian businessman Roman Abramovich in 2002. Abramovich had her refitted to his own preferences by HDW in Kiel, Germany. This included an internal refit and the addition of a  swim platform.

In June 2006, Abramovich lost Le Grand Bleu in a bet to Eugene Shvidler. A mini refit in Port Canaveral, Florida in 2008 included a "green" wastewater treatment system.

In 2016, the boat underwent a refit at Blohm & Voss in Hamburg.

In March of 2022, Forbes reported that the yacht Le Grand Bleu was still owned by Shvidler. At 354 feet and registered in Bermuda, it had a value of $109 million. That March it was sanctioned by the UK and Australia, and on June 6, 2022, was recorded in Ponce, Puerto Rico.

Features 
Le Grand Bleu is powered by two  Deutz engines.

The boat also carries two additional yachts, a  sailing yacht, Bellatrix, and a  motor yacht, Sirius A. She also features two Buzzi sports boats and a landing craft to carry a 4x4 Land Rover. She also has 2 helipads on the superstructure and aft deck.

She supports a crew of 65 and can accommodate 20 visitors.

See also
List of motor yachts by length

References

External links 

Pastrovich Studio

Ships built in Bremen (state)
Motor yachts
2000 ships